The Giraglia Tower is a Genoese tower  located in the commune of Ersa (Haute-Corse) on the island of Giraglia near the north coast of Corsica.

The construction of the tower began in April 1584. It was one of a series of coastal defences constructed by the Republic of Genoa between 1530 and 1620 to stem the attacks by Barbary pirates. The design of the Giaglia tower is unusual in being square rather than round. The tower is owned by the French state and in 2008 was listed as one of the official Historical Monuments of France.

Notes and references

External links
 Includes information on how to reach 90 towers and many photographs.

Towers in Corsica
Monuments historiques of Corsica
Buildings and structures in Haute-Corse